This is a list of women artists who were born in Norway or whose artworks are closely associated with that country.

A
Ingvil Aarbakke (1970–2005), active in Danish N55
Marie Aarestrup (1826–1919), portrait painter
Betzy Akersloot-Berg (1850–1922), painter
Borghild Arnesen (1872–1950), painter and decorative metalworker
Dina Aschehoug (1861–1956), painter
Linda Aslaksen (born 1986), Sami street artist
Ellen Auensen (born 1944), illustrator
Marianne Aulie (born 1971), artist
Siri Aurdal (born 1937), sculptor

B
Harriet Backer (1845–1932), painter
Liv Blåvarp (born 1956), artisan, jewellery designer
Guri Berg (born 1963), sculptor
Anna-Eva Bergman (1909–1987), expressionist painter
Charlotte Block Hellum (1911–2005), ceramist and enameller
Tulla Blomberg Ranslet (born 1928), painter and sculptor
Kari Bøge (born 1950), writer, illustrator
Lisbeth Bodd (1958–2014), performance artist
Asbjørg Borgfelt (1900–1976), sculptor
Johanna Bugge Berge (1874–1961), painter, illustrator, church decorator
Elise Brandes (1873–1918), sculptor
Cecilie Broch Knudsen (born 1950), rector of the Oslo National Academy of the Arts 
Lagertha Broch (1864–1952), illustrator
Kari Buen (born 1938), sculptor
Ragnhild Butenschøn (1912–1992), sculptor

C
Bodil Cappelen (born 1930), painter, textile artist and illustrator
Elen Christensen (1904–1967), sculptor
Tupsy Clement (1871–1959), landscape painter
Jensine Costello (born 1886), painter

D
Lisbet Dæhlin (1922–2012), ceramist
Cecilie Dahl (1858–1943), painter
Cecilie Dahl (born 1960), installation artist
Damselfrau or Magnhild Kennedy (born 1978), wearable art specialist
Annasif Døhlen (1930–2021), sculptor
Brit Dyrnes (born 1965), ceramist

E
Fam Ekman (born 1946), Swedish-Norwegian children's writer, illustrator

F
Yngvild Fagerheim (born 1942), ceramist
Mimi Falsen (1861–1957), painter
Ellinor Flor (born 1946), textile designer
Mimi Frellsen (1830–1914), pioneering female photographer
Kristin Frogner (born 1978), actress, sculptor
Åse Frøyshov (born 1943), textile artist
Brit Fuglevaag (born 1939), textile artist

G
Inger Giskeødegård (born 1956), illustrator
Andrea Gram (1853–1927), painter
Anita Greve (1905–1972), painter
Ulrikke Greve (1868–1951), textile artist
Kari Grossmann (born 1942), illustrator, children's writer
Nora Gulbrandsen (1894–1974), porcelain designer, ceramic artist

H
Elisabeth Haarr (born 1945), textile artist
Karine Haaland (born 1966), animator, illustrator
Dagny Hald (1936–2001), ceramist, illustrator 
Else Halling (1899–1987), textile artist
Frida Hansen (1855–1931), tapestry maker
Aasta Hansteen (1824–1908), painter, writer, and early feminist
Marie Hauge (1864–1931), painter
Astri Welhaven Heiberg (1881–1967), painter
Hanne Heuch (born 1954), ceramist
Agnes Hiorth (1899–1984), painter
Marie Høeg (1866–1949), photographer
Karen Holtsmark (1907–1998), painter
Lalla Hvalstad (1875–1962), painter and ceramist

I
Ellen Iden (1897–1961), painter
Åshild Irgens (born 1976), illustrator

J
Elise Jakhelln (1909–2002), textile designer
Else Marie Jakobsen (1927–2012), designer, textile artist
Gro Jessen (1938–2003), textile artist

K
Ragnhild Kaarbø (1889–1949), painter
Jane Jin Kaisen (born 1980), video artist
Ragnhild Keyser (1889–1943), abstract painter
Kitty Lange Kielland (1843–1914), landscape painter
Anita Killi (born 1968), animator, film director
Grete Prytz Kittelsen (1917–2010), goldsmith, enamel artist and designer
Sol Kjøk (fl. from mid-1990s), visual artist
Annelise Knudtzon (1914–2006), textile artist
Cecilie Broch Knudsen (born 1950), artist, educator
Catharine Hermine Kølle (1788–1859), Norway's first female painter
Anne Krafft (born 1957), painter and photographer
Oda Krohg (1860–1935), painter

L
Dagny Tande Lid (1903–1998), painter and illustrator
Edvarda Lie (1910–1963), painter and illustrator
Margrethe von der Lippe (1913–1999), ceramist
Ann Lislegaard (born 1962), contemporary artist
Anne Lofthus (1932–2003), ceramist
Marie Løkke (1877–1948), impressionist painter
Ingrid Lønningdal (born 1981), contemporary artist
Ida Lorentzen (born 1951), American-born Norwegian painter
Camilla Løw (born 1976), painter

M
Ada Madssen (1917–2009), sculptor
Hilde Mæhlum (born 1945), sculptor
Nina Malterud (born 1951), ceramist
Hilde Marstrander (born 1969), illustrator, fashion journalist
Eline McGeorge (born 1970), contemporary artist
Randi Monsen (1910–1997), illustrator
Vilna Jorgen Morpurgo (1900–1975), painter, sculptor
Lagertha Munthe (1888–1984), painter
Lise Myhre (born 1975), cartoonist
Pia Myrvold (born 1960), artist and designer

N
Ute de Lange Nilsen (born 1931), Czech-Norwegian jewellery artist and puppet maker
Louise Nippierd (born 1962), metal and jewellery artist
Irene Nordli (born 1967), visual artist and sculptor
Asta Nørregaard (1853–1933), painter
Kaja Norum (born 1989), painter
Kari Nyquist (1918–2011), ceramist

O
Suzanne Øgaard (1918–2003), French-born Norwegian painter
Vivian Zahl Olsen (born 1942), graphic designer, illustrator
Kjerstin Øvrelid (1929–1989), painter

P
Alice Pihl Salvesen (1869–1959), painter
Martine Poppe (born 1988), painter, sculptor
Else Poulsson (1909–2002), painter, textile artist

R
Tulla Blomberg Ranslet (born 1928), painter
Maja Refsum (1897–1986), sculptor
Helga Marie Ring Reusch (1865–1944), painter
Borghild Rud (1910–1999), illustrator
Hannah Ryggen (1894–1970), textile artist
Aase Texmon Rygh (1925–2019), modernist sculptor

S
Bente Sætrang (born 1946), textile artist
Iben Sandemose (born 1950), illustrator, children's writer
Cora Sandel (1880–1974), writer and painter
Iben Sandemose (born 1950), illustrator and writer
Solveig Muren Sanden (1918–2013), illustrator
Inga Sætre (born 1978), illustrator, cartoonist
Signe Scheel (1860–1942), painter
Kjersti Scheen (born 1943), journalist, illustrator and writer
Tone Thiis Schjetne (1928–2015), sculptor
Hanne Sigbjørnsen (born 1989), cartoonist
Inger Sitter (1929–2015), painter, graphic artist
Julie Skarland (born 1960), fashion designer
Ida S. Skjelbakken (born 1979), writer, illustrator
Kari Stai (born 1974), illustrator, graphic designer and children's writer
Agnes Steineger (1863–1965), painter
Tonje Strøm (1937–2010), painter, illustrator
Nina Sundbye (born 1944), sculptor

T
Marie Tannæs (1854–1939), painter
Anne Kristine Thorsby (born 1962), contemporary artist
Ambrosia Tønnesen (1859–1948), sculptor
Kris Torne (1867–1946), painter and textile artist

U
Ingunn Utsi (born 1948), Sami sculptor, painter and illustrator

V
Maria Vigeland (born 1963), painter and sculptor
Ingebrigt Vik (1867–1927), sculptor

W
Inger Waage (1923–1995), ceramist
Charlotte Wankel (1888–1969), cubist painter 
Yvonne Wartiainen (born 1976), abstract painter
Sigri Welhaven (1894–1991), artist and sculptor
Birgit Wessel (1911–2000), textile artist

See also

List of Scandinavian textile artists

-
Norwegian women artists, List of
Artists
Artists, List of